Coronation Street is a British television soap opera. It was first broadcast on ITV on 9 December 1960. The following is a list of all the former characters and the actors who portrayed them in chronological order.



1960s

Last appeared in 1960

Last appeared in 1961

Last appeared in 1962

Last appeared in 1963

Last appeared in 1964

Last appeared in 1965

Last appeared in 1966

Last appeared in 1967

Last appeared in 1968

Last appeared in 1969

1970s

Last appeared in 1970

Last appeared in 1971

Last appeared in 1972

Last appeared in 1973

Last appeared in 1974

Last appeared in 1975

Last appeared in 1976

Last appeared in 1977

Last appeared in 1978

Last appeared in 1979

1980s

Last appeared in 1980

Last appeared in 1981

Last appeared in 1982

Last appeared in 1983

Last appeared in 1984

Last appeared in 1985

Last appeared in 1986

Last appeared in 1987

Last appeared in 1988

Last appeared in 1989

1990s

Last appeared in 1990

Last appeared in 1991

Last appeared in 1992

Last appeared in 1993

Last appeared in 1994

Last appeared in 1995

Last appeared in 1996

Last appeared in 1997

Last appeared in 1998

Last appeared in 1999

2000s

Last appeared in 2000

Last appeared in 2001

Last appeared in 2002

Last appeared in 2003

Last appeared in 2004

Last appeared in 2005

Last appeared in 2006

Last appeared in 2007

Last appeared in 2008

Last appeared in 2009

2010s

Last appeared in 2010

Last appeared in 2011

Last appeared in 2012

Last appeared in 2013

Last appeared in 2014

Last appeared in 2015

Last appeared in 2016

Last appeared in 2017

Last appeared in 2018

Last appeared in 2019

2020s

Last appeared in 2020

Last appeared in 2021

Last appeared in 2022

Last appeared in 2023

See also
 List of Coronation Street characters

References

External links
 Characters and cast at itv.com
 Characters and cast at the Internet Movie Database

 
Coronation Street